Margaret Drummond may refer to:
 Margaret Drummond, Queen of Scotland (1340–1375), queen of King David II of Scotland
 Margaret Drummond (mistress) (died 1501), mistress of James IV of Scotland
 Margaret Drummond (WRNS officer) (1917–1987), British Royal Navy officer